Johor Technology Park is an industrial park located in Kulai District, Johor, Malaysia.

Kulai District
Industrial parks in Malaysia